The Underground Man may refer to:

The Underground Man, a 1971 novel by Ross Macdonald
The Underground Man (novel), a 1997 English novel by Mick Jackson
The narrator of Notes from Underground, an 1864 Russian short novel by Fyodor Dostoevsky
The Underground Man (1974 film), a 1974 American film by Paul Wendkos
The Underground Man (1981 film), a 1981 Argentine film by Nicolás Sarquís
The Underground Man (video game), a 2016 Russian video game